Sapucaia is a municipality located in the Brazilian state of Rio de Janeiro. Its population was 18,249 (2020) and its area is 540 km². Sapucaia is also the local name for the tree Lecythis zabucajo.

References

Municipalities in Rio de Janeiro (state)